Table Producing Language was an IBM mainframe program developed by the US Bureau of Labor Statistics for producing statistical tables.  It has been superseded by the commercial product TPL Tables developed by QQQ Software.

References

External links
QQQ Software

IBM mainframe software
Statistical software